Shashi Town is a rural town in Liuyang City, Hunan Province, People's Republic of China. It is surrounded by the towns of Gaoqiao and Jinjing on the north, Longfu Town on the northeast, Chunkou Town on the southeast, Lukou Town on the west, and the towns of Beisheng and Yong'an on the south.

Administrative division
The town is divided into 11 villages and four communities, the following areas: 
 Xiushan Community
 Hebei Community
 Shashi Community
 Changchun Community
 Tuannong Village
 Yangtian Village
 Wenguang Village
 Dongmen Village
 Baishui Village
 Zhongzhou Village
 Dunmu Village
 Liantang Village
 Youzhu Village
 Chima Village
 Taoyuan Village

Geography
The Laodao River flows through the town.

The town has one lake and two reservoirs: Chima Lake, Jinpen Reservoir and Jinfeng Reservoir.

Two mountains situated at the town: Mount Huangxiling and Mount Sanjianlin.

Economy
The local economy is primarily based upon agriculture and local industry, such as apparel industry, textile industry and mining industry.

Education
 Shashi Middle School

Transportation

Expressway
The Liuyang-Liling Expressway in Hunan leads to Liling through the town.

County road
The town is connected to three county roads: X009, X013 and X011.

Attractions
Chima Lake is a famous scenic spot in the town, it provides water for irrigation and recreational activities.

References

Divisions of Liuyang
Liuyang